Spencerville is an unincorporated community located in Spencer Township, DeKalb County, Indiana, United States. The only covered bridge in DeKalb County is located in Spencerville.

History
The Spencerville post office was established in 1839. Spencerville was named for John Spencer, relative of one of the founders.

Geography

References

External links

Unincorporated communities in DeKalb County, Indiana
Unincorporated communities in Indiana
1839 establishments in the United States
Populated places established in 1839